La Coulée is a rural residential area in the Rural Municipality of Ste. Anne, south-eastern Manitoba, Canada, named for the creek running along its southern border.

Location
Anne. It is within the Rural Municipality of Ste. Anne and therefore its emergency services are provided by the rural municipality. The closest hospital is in Sainte-Anne as well as the nearest post-office.

Economy
Businesses in La Coulée include two hairdressers, a junkyard, a water dealer, a mechanic, and a golf course.

Unincorporated communities in Eastman Region, Manitoba